The 2008 Villanova Wildcats football team was an American football team that represented the Villanova University as a member of the Atlantic 10 Conference during the 2008 NCAA Division I FCS football season. In their 24th year under head coach Andy Talley, the team compiled a 10–3 record.

Schedule

References

Villanova
Villanova Wildcats football seasons
Villanova Wildcats football